Socially responsible marketing is a marketing philosophy that a company should take into consideration; "What is in the best interest of society in the present and long term?"

Overview 

Socially responsible marketing is critical of excessive consumerism and environmental damages caused by corporations. It is based on the idea that market offerings must not be only profit-driven, but they must also reinforce social and ethical values for the benefit of citizens.

The idea of socially responsible marketing is sometimes viewed as an extension of the concept of Corporate Social Responsibility (CSR). CSR is promoted as a business model to help companies self-regulate, recognizing that their activities impact an assortment of stakeholders, including the general public. CSR is sometimes described in terms a pyramid, starting with economic as its base, then legal, ethical and philanthropic actions at the top. It is in the last two layers of the CSR pyramid, ethical and philanthropic, that socially responsible marketing opportunities appear the greatest. Meeting the first two layers, economic and legal, are necessary for a business to thrive in order to engage in the later two.

Socially Responsible Marketing and Ethics 

Social responsibility in marketing is often discussed with ethics. The difference between the two is that what’s considered ethical in terms of business, society and individually may not be the same thing––nor do all business actions necessarily have to be socially responsible in order to be considered ethical. Some viewpoints of socially responsible behavior espouse that the qualifying marketing actions not simply meet the minimum ethical guidelines of business, but voluntarily exceed them.

The Advertising Standards Authority in the UK has laid down some rules which suggest that all marketing communication should be socially responsible. Therefore any content which is irresponsible or incites such behaviour from the audience can be brought to the concern of the Authority. A variety of topics such as alcohol, violence, objectification, body image, drugs, tobacco, etc fall under the socially irresponsible category when used inappropriately by the marketer.

As a Response to Mainstream Marketing 

Socially responsible marketing emerged as a response to questionable marketing practices that have adverse effects on society. The major economic criticisms that the conventional private marketing system receives from are as follows:
 Mainstream marketing strategies generally lead to high prices. Due to the size of the chain of intermediaries in marketing, the distribution of commodities to consumers costs a lot. As a result, individuals pay higher premiums for the goods and services that they receive.
 Contemporary marketing relies heavily on aggressive advertising and promotion. In order to offset the costs, companies charge higher prices through excessive markups.
 Product differentiation is one of the most commonly used marketing tools. But this not only creates an artificial psychological value attached to higher-priced brands but also raises environmental concerns about packaging. As such, socially responsible marketing rejects all deceptive marketing practices in pricing, promotion and packaging, even if they may seem technically legal.
 
In addition to the economic implications, marketing exerts a significant impact on the values of the society. The advocates of socially responsible marketing argue that the current system creates false wants, i.e. encourage people to buy more than they actually need, injects constant desire for material possession, and leads to excessive spending. Too much obsession with material goods in the long run may cause damage to the society as a whole. Corporate profit should not eclipse the collective benefit of the society. Thus, socially responsible marketing draws attention to the “social costs”  that are embedded in the marketing, selling and consumption of private commodities. It calls for a marketing system that contributes to social and environmental sustainability, while producing profits for businesses.

Types 

There are several related marketing concepts that fall under the umbrella of socially responsible marketing, these include: social marketing, cause related marketing, environmental or green marketing, enviropreneurial marketing, quality of life, and socially responsible buying.

Enlightened Marketing 

The philosophy of enlightened marketing is a concept that falls under the umbrella of socially responsible marketing. Enlightened marketing states that “a company’s marketing should support the best long-run performance of the marketing system. This concept contains the five principles:  consumer-oriented marketing, innovative marketing, value marketing, sense-of-mission marketing and societal marketing.

In consumer-oriented marketing, the company “organizes its marketing activities from the consumer's point of view.” Marketing activities focus on the needs of a defined user set.

Innovative marketing states that a company must continue to improve its products and marketing efforts, recognizing that if it doesn’t, it risks losing business to a competitor that does.

The principle of value marketing contends that a company "should put most of its resources into value-building marketing investments." One criticism of marketing its short term focus in the sense of promotions and minor improvements. Value marketing seeks to create long term customer loyalty by adding significant value to the consumer offer.

Sense-of-mission marketing suggests a company mission be defined in "broad social terms" as opposed to "narrow product terms." This technique frames the business goal in a way that the organization can rally behind a deeper sense of purpose. Millennials have become cautious of their brand choices as they are getting affected by socially responsible marketing. They prefer associating with brands that are honest, environmentally conscious, ethical, and working towards the betterment of the society. The rise of TOMS to a $400 million company is a case in point.

The principle of societal marketing asks company's to consider the "consumers' wants and long-run interests, the company's requirements and society's long-run interests."

Benefits to Business 

The practice of socially responsible marketing has many distinct advantages for businesses who choose to embrace it. 
 
In terms of financial advantages, the government has established a number of tax-cuts and other benefits for companies in many industries as incentives to be more socially responsible. For instance, companies that reduce their carbon emissions and pollution levels are often offered tax exemptions and other assets for their cooperation in the country's movement towards environmental awareness and responsibility.
 
Even in cases where pre-determined benefits like this are not available as incentives, it is still in a company's best interest in the long run to move towards more socially responsible methods. By dealing proactively with potentially harmful or socially detrimental marketing methods and deciding to promote the public well-being with their products, a company can effectively eliminate the need for legislative and regulative obstacles in the future. In other words, by making a concerted effort to be socially responsible in the first place, a company provides less of a reason for the government to develop any taxes or extra restrictions on their business in the first place, which helps them in the long run.
 
Similarly, social responsibility in marketing helps to ensure that a company is, in fact, following the rules and this not only instills faith among the customer base, but also helps to keep the company out of any kind of trouble in terms of legal problems and also in terms of public relations.
 
Customers also appreciate social responsibility and as a result, companies can gain business and maintain it with more ease. For example, if a company can certify their product as "green," they gain a certain degree of competitive advantage over competition and many customers will be more willing to buy their product than one that has not been certified as "green," because they perceive the value of the product to be higher than others. Further, these types of things can instill a sense of faith and goodwill in customers and cause the consumers not only to feel better about buying the product in the first place, but also feel better about buying it again. Socially responsible marketing makes sense as a business strategy because it not only broadens and expands the customer base, but increases the likelihood of developing customer loyalty and getting them to buy their product again in the future.

References 

Spitzer, Randy; Is Social Responsibility Good? Journal for Quality & Participation. Oct2010, Vol. 33 Issue 3, p13-17. 5p

Corporate social responsibility
Types of marketing